"NYC Beat" is the second single from Armand Van Helden's seventh studio album, Ghettoblaster. It is a cover/sample of the early 80's single New York City Beats, performed by Fenton Bailey and Randy Barbato, performing as the Fabulous Pop Tarts.

Music video
At the beginning of the video, the date circled is Wednesday 10 June, the next time those dates fall into the calendar at the time was 2009.

The video stars Daisy Lowe (brunette) and Leah Hibbert (from Shipwrecked: Battle of The Islands) She is the short haired blonde model, and another unidentified blond model partaking in a variety of apple related activities.

Track listing
Australia CD Single
"NYC Beat" (Radio Edit) – 3:14
"NYC Beat" (Original) – 6:27
"NYC Beat" (MSTRKRFT Remix) – 4:58
"NYC Beat" (Emperor Machine Remix) – 8:03
"NYC Beat" (Detroit Remix) – 8:09
"NYC Beat" (Prince Language Remix) – 7:15

12"
 NYC Beat (Original)
 NYC Beat (MSTRKRFT Remix)
 NYC Beat (Emperor Machine Dub)

Chart history

References

2007 singles
Armand Van Helden songs
Songs written by Armand Van Helden
2007 songs